The Washington Borough Public Schools is a community public school district that serves students in kindergarten through sixth grade from Washington Borough, in Warren County, New Jersey, United States.

As of the 2018–19 school year, the district, comprised of two schools, had an enrollment of 481 students and 44.6 classroom teachers (on an FTE basis), for a student–teacher ratio of 10.8:1.

The district is classified by the New Jersey Department of Education as being in District Factor Group "DE", the fifth-highest of eight groupings. District Factor Groups organize districts statewide to allow comparison by common socioeconomic characteristics of the local districts. From lowest socioeconomic status to highest, the categories are A, B, CD, DE, FG, GH, I and J.

Students in public school for seventh through twelfth grades attend the Warren Hills Regional School District, which serves students from Washington Borough, along with those from Franklin Township, Mansfield Township and Washington Township, as well as students from Oxford Township (for 9-12 only, attending on a tuition basis). Schools in the district (with 2018–19 enrollment data from the National Center for Education Statistics) are 
Warren Hills Regional Middle School located in Washington Borough with 542 students in grades 7-8 and 
Warren Hills Regional High School located in Washington Township with 1,205 students in grades 9-12.

Schools
Schools in the district (with 2018–19 enrollment data from the National Center for Education Statistics) are:
Taylor Street School with 188 students in grades PreK - 2
Sherry  N. Koeppen, Principal
Memorial School with 293 students in grades 3 - 6
Jacqueline Nassry, Principal

Administration
Core members of the district's administration are:
Jacqueline Nassry, Superintendent
Timothy Mantz, Business Administrator / Board Secretary

Board of education
The district's board of education, comprised of nine members, sets policy and oversees the fiscal and educational operation of the district through its administration. As a Type II school district, the board's trustees are elected directly by voters to serve three-year terms of office on a staggered basis, with three seats up for election each year held (since 2012) as part of the November general election. The board appoints a superintendent to oversee the day-to-day operation of the district.

References

External links
Washington Borough Public Schools

School Data for the Washington Borough Public Schools, National Center for Education Statistics
Warren Hills Regional School District

Washington, New Jersey
New Jersey District Factor Group DE
School districts in Warren County, New Jersey